Martin Němec (born 16 June 1957 in Prague) is a Czech rock musician and composer.

Between 1977 and 1983 he studied at Academy of Fine Arts, Prague. In 1982, he founded the band called Precedens together with singer-songwriter Jan Sahara Hedl. He is keyboardist and a leader of this group. Since 2002, he is member of Lili Marlene, which released two studio albums. He is also film score composer, screenwriter and painter. He is a son of Czech painter Josef Němec.

References

External links
Official website

1957 births
Living people
Czech keyboardists
Musicians from Prague